DJ Savyo (born: Savio Joseph Mendez) is an Indian DJ and music composer.

Major Events 

 Dubai Expo 2022 Jubilee Stage
 Celebrity Cricket League
 Indian Super League
 Indian Premier League Season 3 Kochi
 Amrita TV Award Night
 Asianet Dance Party

Tracks

References